Vazan may refer to:

Bill Vazan (born 1933), Canadian artist
Michal Važan, Slovak ice hockey player
Vazan, Iran, a village in Razavi Khorasan Province, Iranl